Enpiperate is a calcium channel blocker.

References

Calcium channel blockers
Piperidines